Arge scapularis or elm argid sawfly is a sawfly in the family Argidae. It is found across North America and commonly infests elm trees. The name "scapularis" refers to the insect's distinctive so-called "shoulder blades".

References

Argidae
Insects described in 1814
Taxa named by Johann Christoph Friedrich Klug